G:MT – Greenwich Mean Time is a 1999 British drama film.

Starring Steve John Shepherd and Chiwetel Ejiofor, the film features music by acid jazz and jungle artists including Talvin Singh, Hinda Hicks and Imogen Heap. It was also one of the last projects of the late jazz trumpeter Lester Bowie.

Plot
Set against a backdrop of 20th century fin-de-siècle London, it focuses on a multi-racial group of South London youths who form a band called Greenwich Mean Time. Four years after college graduation, they all work out what direction their lives are headed, including girlfriend problems, an ill-fated venture into drug dealing, and sleazy record producers. As the film progresses, the narrative inches its protagonists toward a sudden bloody finale.

Reception
The film was not well received by critics, with writer Mirren suggesting some of the response was directed at the fact he is Helen Mirren's nephew (and the producer was Helen Mirren's partner), and so he was being given a "helping hand" as a result. Parallels with the 1996 film Trainspotting were also noted, in an unfavourable context.

A limited UK release meant that the film did better business elsewhere, but it was only released on DVD in the United States, the Netherlands and Germany. Several of the film's actors have gone on to become well-known, and the soundtrack to the film was well received.

References

External links
 

1999 films
British drama films
Films set in London
1990s English-language films
1990s British films